Wet dream is a colloquial expression for nocturnal emission.

Wet Dream may also refer to:
 Wet Dream (album), a 1978 album by Richard Wright
 Wet Dreams (film), a 2002 South Korean film
 "Wet Dream" (Max Romeo song), 1968
 "Wet Dream" (Wet Leg song), 2021
 "Wet Dream", a 1984 novelty song by Kip Addotta
 "Wet Dreams", a song by Ocean Alley from the 2020 album Lonely Diamond
 "Wet Dreams", a song by Pepper from the 2008 album Pink Crustaceans and Good Vibrations

Other uses
 Wet Dream', a colloquial name for a number of motorcycles in the Honda CB series bearing the moniker Superdream

See also
 The Wet Dream, a 2005 Iranian film directed by Pouran Derakhshandeh
 "Wet Dreamz", a 2014 song by J. Cole